MRD may refer to:

Fiction
 Mutant Response Division, fictional Marvel Comics organization
 MRD, fictional substance used for time travel in the 2015 film Synchronicity

Medicine
 Medical records department in a hospital
 Minimal residual disease low levels of leukaemia cells present in the body after or during treatment

Sports
 Mad Rollin' Dolls, Woman's Flat Track Roller Derby League in Madison, WI, USA
 Manchester Roller Derby, co-ed roller derby league in Manchester, England

Technology
 Market requirements document, used in technology product development and planning
 Multicast router discovery network protocol
 Machine-readable dictionary

Transport
 Alberto Carnevalli Airport in IATA code
 Meridian LRT station, Singapore, LRT station abbreviation

Other
 Mandy Rice-Davies, British former model and showgirl
 Marching Royal Dukes, the official marching band of James Madison University in Harrisonburg, Virginia
 Required minimum distribution, also called minimum required distribution, US IRS requirement for age-based retirement account distributions
 Miss Dominican Republic
 Motor Racing Developments Ltd., racing car constructor better known as Brabham
 Movement for the Restoration of Democracy, political alliance in Pakistan